Major General James Murdoch Archer Durrant,  (17 March 1885 – 17 September 1963) was a senior officer in the Australian Army.

Durrant was born in Glenelg, South Australia and enlisted on 1 July 1907 at Lawley, South Australia, service number QP20006. He was appointed captain in the 13th Battalion on 20 December 1914, major on 2 May 1915 and lieutenant colonel on 20 August 1916. On 1 October 1919 he was Staff Officer in charge Repatriation and Demobilisation Department.

In 1939 Durrant was District Officer Commanding 5th Military District and in 1942 he was General Officer Commanding Queensland Lines of Communication Area. He was discharged 5 April 1944.

References
Major General James Murdoch Archer Durrant, CMG, DSO at the Australian War Memorial
Durrant, James Murdoch Arthur at World War 2 Nominal Roll

External links
Durrant, James Murdoch Arthur at Generals.dk

1885 births
1963 deaths
Military personnel from South Australia
Australian Companions of the Distinguished Service Order
Australian Companions of the Order of St Michael and St George
Australian generals
Australian military personnel of World War I
Australian Army personnel of World War II
People from Adelaide